Frank Chandler "Shorty" Longman (December 7, 1882 – April 4, 1928) was an American college football player and coach. He was born Dec. 7, 1882 in Fulton, a small community in rural Kalamazoo County, Michigan. By 1894, the Longman family had moved to Kalamazoo, and Chandler attended and played on the football team at Kalamazoo High School (later known as Kalamazoo Central High School). He was a member of the June 1902 Kalamazoo High School graduating class, according to an article in the June 19, 1902 Kalamazoo Telegraph.

Longman played college football at the University of Michigan from 1903 to 1905, where he was a star fullback. He later served as the head football coach at the University of Arkansas (1906–1907), and the University of Notre Dame (1909–1910).

Longman was one of the stars of Fielding H. Yost's "Point-a-Minute" teams at the University of Michigan in 1903, 1904, and 1905.  In December 1904, the Chicago Daily Tribune wrote: "Longman hits the line like a stone shot from a catapult."  University of Chicago star, Walter Eckersall, later wrote of Longman:

From 1906 to 1907, he served as the head football coach at the University of Arkansas, where he compiled a 5–8–3 record. He then coached for one season at the College of Wooster in 1908. From 1909 to 1910, he coached at Notre Dame, where his teams went 11–1–2.

Longman coached the first Notre Dame team to beat the University of Michigan on the gridiron, beating the squad led by Yost, his former coach, 11-3 on Nov. 6, 1909.

Knute Rockne, who went on to become a Notre Dame football star and later a legendary coach of the Fighting Irish, played as a freshman on Longman's 1910 team.

In December 1910, Longman sold a photographic business and opened a new business in Ann Arbor, Michigan as a manufacturer of flashlight powders.  In August 1911, Longman resigned as the coach at Notre Dame. At the time, The Indianapolis Star wrote:

Longman married Edythe Eberbach on July 10, 1906 in Ann Arbor, Michigan.

Longman died from tuberculosis of the lungs and larynx at the University of Michigan Hospital in 1928 at age 45.

Head coaching record

References

1882 births
1928 deaths
American football fullbacks
Arkansas Razorbacks football coaches
Michigan Wolverines football players
Notre Dame Fighting Irish football coaches
Wooster Fighting Scots football coaches
Sportspeople from Kalamazoo, Michigan
Players of American football from Michigan
20th-century deaths from tuberculosis
Players of American football from Ann Arbor, Michigan
Tuberculosis deaths in Michigan